Michael David Bertotti (born January 18, 1970) is a retired Major League Baseball pitcher. He played during three seasons at the major league level for the Chicago White Sox. He was signed by the White Sox in the 31st round of the 1991 amateur draft. He was given a $1,000 signing bonus upon his request.

Bertotti played college baseball for Iona College.

External links

1970 births
Living people
American expatriate baseball players in Canada
Baseball players from Jersey City, New Jersey
Birmingham Barons players
Calgary Cannons players
Chicago White Sox players
Columbus Clippers players
Hickory Crawdads players
Iona Gaels baseball players
Major League Baseball pitchers
Midland RockHounds players
Nashville Sounds players
New Jersey Jackals players
Prince William Cannons players
South Bend White Sox players
Tacoma Rainiers players
Utica Blue Sox players
Waterbury Spirit players